Bennet Tyler (July 10, 1783 – May 14, 1858) was an American Congregational clergyman and educator. He served as president of Dartmouth College between 1822 and 1828.  His Reformed theology was called "Tylerism", as opposed to the post-Reformed Taylorism of Nathaniel William Taylor.

Biography
To succeed President Daniel Dana, Dartmouth Trustees selected Bennet Tyler, a South Britain, Connecticut, minister and graduate of Yale. Tyler was very devout, and he was especially interested  in preaching in the College church, letting others do the teaching. He was successful in endowing the first scholarship at Dartmouth, intended for "the education of pious, indigent young men for the ministry". He also stabilized the enrollment, which had plummeted during the Revolutionary War.

It was in 1824, during President Tyler's administration, that Dartmouth admitted its first African-American student, Edward Mitchell, in 1824.

Tyler returned to the ministry after six years as Dartmouth President. He was a founder, theology professor, and president of the Theological Institute of Connecticut, now Hartford Seminary, from 1834 to 1857.

Notes

Further reading
W. A. Hoffecker, "Taylor, Nathaniel William", in Evangelical Dictionary of Theology (1990), Grand Rapids, MI:  Baker.

1783 births
1858 deaths
Presidents of Dartmouth College
People from Middlebury, Connecticut